The Performing Arts Festival, abbreviated as PAF, is the biggest inter-hostel cultural competition in the Indian Institute of Technology Bombay located at Powai in Mumbai (India). The term PAF is used to refer not only to the festival itself, but also to the individual cultural performances that constitute the festival.

Both undergraduate and graduate students at IIT Bombay participate in the preparation and organization of the festival. Typically six hostels (out of eighteen) are grouped together by random draw for each PAF. Though technically a drama, each PAF comprises contributions from several of the cultural arts including dramatics, literature, music, fine arts, debating and dance. Since 1999, the PAF has been held at the Open Air Theater (OAT) inside the Students' Activity Center (SAC), within the main campus of IIT Bombay. Typically, all dialogues at PAF are delivered using voice overs and not by the actors themselves, mainly owing to the large size and structure of the OAT. This requires co-ordination between the actors and the voice actors.

Prod

The major work of a PAF is the preparation of the sets by fellow students. It is commonly called prod or prodwork, abbreviations for productions. Prod consists of making sets using bamboo, jute rope and screens made with layers of newspaper glued together by freshmen and seniors in co-operation. Structures strong enough to hold the weight of more than two or three people have been prepared. In the PAF of 2007, for instance, a two-storeyed set was made in order to give the dramatists a chance to perform at an elevated level.

Production sets require a maximum amount of man hours to put them in place. Building of production sets (usually from bamboo) starts about a month before the PAF. The teams are allowed 3 days to install the sets and perform the finishing touches in the Open Air Theater.

Theme and language
PAFs can be made in Hindi or English. Themes chosen are usually serious and have been drawn from history, science fiction, social injustice, biographies etc. The only caveat is that the scripts are expected to be original.

Grouping
Though seemingly random, the teams are formed in a way that ensures fair chance for each. The pool of hostels is split into tiers based on their overall standings in the inter hostel cultural general championships (GCs) held throughout the year. The tiers then get split and mixed with other tiers either through a draw or mutual consensus.

Major changes
 2004 - Hostel 1 becomes a regular participant, having appeared only thrice in the past eleven years.
 2006 - Number of PAFs brought down from five to four. The maximum team size increases to four.
 2014-15 - New hostels 15 and 16 get added to the hostel pool.
 2016 - The number of PAFs was brought down by one, to three in total, owing to the burden on resources and budget constraints. The teams now consist of six hostels each, the largest till date.

Recent PAFs

The PAF season is at IIT Bombay during the last fortnight of March and the first week of April each year, officially culminating all the extracurricular activities of IIT Bombay for that academic year. Some recent PAFs include:

 = Tie 
Main language used is Hindi unless stated otherwise

It has been observed that 2002 was the last time when the team performing first won the PAF.

See also
Indian Institutes of Technology
IIT Bombay

References

External links
 http://www.insightiitb.org/2010/entertainment/

Indian Institutes of Technology festivals
Education in Mumbai
Arts festivals in India
Educational institutions in India with year of establishment missing